Diaugasma epicharta is a species of sea snail, a marine gastropod mollusk in the family Raphitomidae.

Description
The length of the shell attains 5 mm, and its diameter 1.75 mm.

The small oblong-fusiform shell is semi-pellucid. It is unicolorous white, or flecked with pale straw-colored spots. It contains six whorls of which three in the protoconch. These are closely and very finely cancellate. The subsequent whorls are slightly ventricose and almost smooth. The very delicate and irregular spiral striation across the whorls is almost evanescent. The body whorl is smooth centrally. The narrow aperture is oblong. The outer lip is nearly straight. It is incrassate, white and shining. The columella stands upright. The siphonal canal is short. The sinus is hardly expressed.

Distribution
This marine species occurs in the Gulf of Oman

References

External links
 J.C. Melvill (1917), A revision of the Turridae (Pleurotomidae) occurring in the Persian Gulf, Gulf of Oman and North Arabian Sea, as evidenced mostly through the results of dredgings carried out by Mr. F. W. Townsend, 1893-1914;  Proceedings of the Malacological Society of London vol. 12, 1917  
 

epicharta
Gastropods described in 1903